May Kassab (born December 8, 1981) is a popular female singer and actress from Egypt. She has signed with Rotana, the biggest Record company in the Middle East.

Discography
Haga Teksef
Ahla Min al Kalam
Ana Less Hena

External links
 Listen to May Kassab's Latest album : Ahla Men El Kalam
 May Kassab

1981 births
Living people
21st-century Egyptian women singers
Egyptian film actresses
Egyptian television actresses
Singers who perform in Egyptian Arabic
Singers who perform in Classical Arabic
Rotana Records artists